Maija Avotins and Lisa McShea defeated Pam Nelson and Julie Steven in the final, 2–6, 6–4, 6–3 to win the girls' doubles tennis title at the 1992 Wimbledon Championships.

Seeds

  Laurence Courtois /  Nancy Feber (semifinals)
  Lindsay Davenport /  Chanda Rubin (first round, withdrew)
  Zuzana Nemšáková /  Ludmila Richterová (second round)
  Maija Avotins /  Lisa McShea (champions)
  María Landa /  Ninfa Marra (quarterfinals)
  Mami Donoshiro /  Ai Sugiyama (second round, withdrew)
  Pam Nelson /  Julie Steven (final)
  Rossana de los Ríos /  Larissa Schaerer (second round)

Draw

Finals

Top half

Bottom half

References

External links

Girls' Doubles
Wimbledon Championship by year – Girls' doubles